Shaun Griffiths (born 24 November 1991) is an English professional darts player who currently plays in the Professional Darts Corporation (PDC) events.

Career
Griffiths won consecutive Winmau World Youth Masters titles in 2007 and 2008. In 2010, he won the British Teenage Open and reached the quarter-finals of the 2011 PDC Under-21 World Championship, losing 3–4 to Michael van Gerwen.
Griffiths qualified for the 2011 BDO World Darts Championship by defeating John Henderson, John Lakeman and Andy Boulton. In the first round he lost 0–3 in sets to Joey ten Berge.

Griffiths qualified for the 2011 PDC Pro Tour as one of four semi-finalists from the first day of the Q School. His best result of the year came at the Bobby Bourn Memorial Players Championship, when he lost to James Wade in the last 16.

He is sponsored by the Sky Sports darts commentator John Gwynne. He works as a sales assistant at the Trafford Centre and supports Manchester City F.C.

World Championship results

BDO
 2011: First round (lost to Joey ten Berge 0–3) (sets)

References

External links

1991 births
Living people
British Darts Organisation players
English darts players
Sportspeople from Manchester
Professional Darts Corporation former tour card holders